In mathematics, Tucker decomposition decomposes a tensor into a set of matrices and one small core tensor.  It is named after Ledyard R. Tucker
although it goes back to Hitchcock in 1927.
Initially described as a three-mode extension of factor analysis and principal component analysis it may actually be generalized to higher mode analysis, which is also called higher-order singular value decomposition (HOSVD).

It may be regarded as a more flexible PARAFAC (parallel factor analysis) model.  In PARAFAC the core tensor is restricted to be "diagonal".

In practice, Tucker decomposition is used as a modelling tool. For instance, it is used to model three-way (or higher way) data by means of relatively small numbers of components for each of the three or more modes, and the components are linked to each other by a three- (or higher-) way core array. The model parameters are estimated in such a way that, given fixed numbers of components, the modelled data optimally resemble the actual data in the least squares sense. The model gives a summary of the information in the data, in the same way as principal components analysis does for two-way data.

Taking  for all  is always sufficient to represent  exactly, but often  can be compressed or efficiently approximately by choosing .

There are two special cases of Tucker decomposition:

Tucker2: if  is identity, then  .

See also
 Higher-order singular value decomposition
 Multilinear principal component analysis

References 

Dimension reduction